The 1991 Costa Rica earthquake, also known as the Limon earthquake or Bocas del Toro earthquake, occurred at 3:57 pm local time (21:56:51 UTC) on April 22. The earthquake was the strongest recorded in Costa Rica's history, and was felt throughout the country as well as in western Panama.

Damage
The earthquake claimed 48 lives in Costa Rica and 79 in Bocas del Toro, Panama. Roads and bridges between Limon and Sixaola were all destroyed, and the epicentral region was only accessible by helicopter from the Panamaian side.

In Panama, extensive damage also occurred in Guabito, Changuinola, Almirante and Isla Colon. The Chiquita Brands office building in Changuinola separated with a 3-meter breach.

Aftermath
The international bridge of Sixaola stayed intact. At the Changuinola "Capitán Manuel Niño" International Airport damage on the south end of the runway was severe, and very few planes were able to land. Helicopters were the primary aircraft bringing in relief workers, food, and supplies.

By 1993, the Changuinola-Guabito road was reconstructed with $10 million USD funded by the Panamanian government, and new housing facilities were constructed in Finca 4 and Almirante. Reconstruction of the Limon-Sixaola road took months, and in 2010 the road was paved and coded as Highway 36.

See also
List of earthquakes in 1991
List of earthquakes in Costa Rica
List of earthquakes in Panama

References

External links
 El terremoto de Bocas del Toro 22 de abril, 1991 : Crónica del desastre 
 

Costa Rica
Costa Rica
Geography of Costa Rica
Earthquakes in Costa Rica
Panama
1991 tsunamis
Earthquakes in Panama